The Wills Act 1837 (1 Vict. c 26) is an Act of the Parliament of the United Kingdom that confirms the power of every adult to dispose of their real and personal property, whether they are the outright owner or a beneficiary under a trust, by will on their death (s.3). The act extends to all testamentary dispositions or gifts, where "a person makes a disposition of his property to take effect after his decease, and which is in its own nature ambulatory and revocable during his life." , much of it remains in force in England and Wales.

Background
Under ecclesiastical law, common law and equity, various customary rules had long existed for disposing of personal property by will. However, the power to gift real property by will had been first granted by the Statute of Wills (1540). Various rules grew up around the formalities necessary to create a valid will and the Statute of Frauds (1677) created the requirement that a will of real property must be in writing. By the early nineteenth century, the rules had become complex, with different rules for formalising wills of real and personal property. The 4th report of the Commissioners for Inquiring into the Law of Real Property recommended a simplified and unified scheme. As the Commissioners observed "Any scrap of paper, or memorandum in ink or in pencil, mentioning an intended disposition of his property, is admitted as a will and will be valid, although written by another person, and not read over to the testator, or even seen by him, if proved to be made in his lifetime according to his instructions." A bill was introduced by the Attorney General Sir John Campbell, one of the Commissioners, in 1834 though it was much delayed for want of parliamentary time. The bill was introduced in the House of Lords by Lord Langdale.

Though the requirement that a will be in writing stems from an attempt to frustrate fraud, an apparent exception to the requirements for the formal execution of the Act under section 9 is a secret trust.

Provisions of the Act currently in force

Capacity
A minor, as of 2008 a person under the age of 18, cannot make a valid will (s.7), unless they are a member of the armed forces on active service or a mariner at sea (s.11). These provisions were clarified by the Wills (Soldiers and Sailors) Act 1918 (see below).

Requirements of a valid will
A will is only valid if (s.9):
It is made in writing;
It is signed by the testator, or at his direction and in his presence;
The testator intends that the signature give effect to the will;
The will is made or acknowledged in the presence of two or more witnesses, present at the same time; and
Each witness attests and signs, or acknowledges, his signature in the presence of the testator.

There is no requirement to publish a will (s.13). If any of the witnesses was, or subsequently becomes, incapable of proving the will, that alone will not make it invalid (s.14). Alterations must be executed in the same manner as a will (s.21).

Revocation of a will
Section 18 revokes the will in the event of the marriage of the testator. However, this section was amended in 1982 so that where the testator makes the will in the expectation of marriage to a particular person, the will is not revoked by such a marriage. Section 18A was added in 1982 to the effect that divorce and annulment have the same effect as the death of a spouse.

A will or codicil cannot be revoked by any presumption of the intention of the testator or on the grounds of any alteration in his circumstances (s.19). A will can only be revoked by (s.20):
Another properly executed will or codicil;
A document executed under the same formalities as a will, declaring an intention to revoke the will; or
Destruction of the will by the testator, or some person in his presence, with the intention of revoking the will.

A revoked will or codicil cannot be revived other than by its re-execution or by a formally executed codicil (s.22).

Gifts to witnesses
Gifts under the will to an attesting witness, or their spouse, are null and void. However, such a witness can still prove the will (s.15). There is no bar on a creditor of the testator or the executor of the will being a witness (ss.16–17).

Gifts to children
Where the testator makes a gift to one of his children or a remoter descendant, and that child dies before the testator, the gift will not lapse so long as the deceased descendant himself leaves children surviving at the death of the testator. The surviving descendants receive the gift (s.33) "according to their stock", i.e. per stirpes. The rule also applies to illegitimate children (s.33(4)(a)) and a person conceived before the death of the testator is deemed to have been living at the testator's death (s.33(4)(b)).

Interpretation
The will is interpreted in respect of the testator's property immediately before his death (s.24). Where the testator makes a gift of all his real property, it is deemed to include property over which he has a power of appointment (s.27).

Ireland and Northern Ireland
The Act was in force in Ireland until partition. It consequently became the law of the Irish Free State on 6 December 1922, and then of its successor states. When Ireland was partitioned and the statelet of Northern Ireland created on 7 December 1922, the Act became the law of Northern Ireland. However, all save sections 1 and 11 were repealed and re-enacted, with amendments, in Northern Ireland in 1995 following the recommendations of the Land Law Working Group.

Provisions repealed by the Act
Statute of Wills

Provisions of the Act, since repealed
Sections 4 to 6 addressed various technicalities of land law since rendered obsolete. The Act did not extend to estates pur autre vie and various manorial rights were preserved over the land devised. Where land was held subject to a Lord of the Manor, for example under a copyhold, the Act required that the will was recorded in the Court Roll of the manor and that various fees and duties were paid. These provisions became irrelevant following the demise of the manorial system with the Law of Property Act 1925.

Section 8 maintained the earlier incapacity of a feme covert to make a will. This was reformed in the late 19th century and formally repealed in 1969.

Wills (Soldiers and Sailors) Act 1918
The Wills (Soldiers and Sailors) Act 1918 clarifies and extends the Wills Act 1837. Section 1 makes if clear that a soldier on active service or sailor at sea, can make, and always could have made, a valid will, even though under 18 years of age. Section 2 extends the provision to sailors not at sea but who are employed in similar service to a soldier on active service. "Soldier" include a member of the Air Force (s.5). This Act is in force in Scotland, but this may be to no effect as it acts only by reference to the Wills Act 1837, which is not in effect there but is in effect, in modified form, in Northern Ireland.

See also
Wills Act

References

Bibliography

 (Google Books)
— (ed. Jennings, R.) (1951) A Treatise on Wills, 8th ed., London:Sweet & Maxwell, vol.I, p.26
Mirow, M. C. (1994) "Last wills and testaments in England 1500–1800", in Vanderlinden, J. (ed.) Actes à cause de mort: Acts of last will, Brussels: De Boeck Université, pp47–84 

Wills and trusts in the United Kingdom
Inheritance
United Kingdom Acts of Parliament 1837
Acts of the Parliament of the United Kingdom concerning England and Wales
English trusts law
Acts of the Parliament of the United Kingdom concerning Ireland